Avid Dancer (born Jacob Dillian Summers) is an American rock musician.

Career
Prior to becoming a musician, Summers was a United States marine. Summers released his first song titled "Stop Playing With My Heart" in 2013. Summers released his debut EP titled I Want To See You Dance in September 2014. In April 2015, Summers released his debut full-length album, 1st Bath, via Grand Jury.

Discography
Studio albums
1st Bath (2015, Grand Jury)
Sharaya (2018, self released)

EPs
I Want To See You Dance (2014, Grand Jury)

Singles

 You Only Like Me With The Lights Out
 I Feel It
 Feels
 Be With You

References

American alternative rock musicians
Living people
Year of birth missing (living people)